The Hungarian Open Air Museum is Hungary’s largest outdoor collection, founded in 1967. The open-air museum shows Carpathian folk architecture and life in various areas of Hungary.

Inspired by the creation of Skansen, established in Stockholm in 1891, the Hungarian facility in Szentendre was founded in 1967 after years of preparation by ethnographers. Opened as the "Village Museum Department" of the Budapest Ethnographic Museum, in 1972 it became independent. The museum has an area of 46 hectares at Sztaravoda.

There are eight areas of the museum:

 North Hungarian Village
 Upland Market Town
 Upper-Tisza
 Great Plains
 Southern Transdanubia
 Bakony, Balaton Uplands
 Western Transdanubia
 Kisalföld

References

Hungarian Open Air Museum Guide book, Hungarian Open Air Museum Szentendre, Szentendre 2007. 
http://skanzen.hu/en/skanzen/who-we-are/about-the-skanzen
http://skanzen.hu/en/skanzen/who-we-are/museum-history

Museums in Pest County
Open-air museums in Hungary
Szentendre